Carlos Rasch (6 April 1932 in Curitiba, Brazil - 7 January 2021) was a science fiction author, whose works mostly appeared in East Germany before German reunification.

Biography 
At the age of six, he moved with his parents from Brazil to Germany. In 1951 he started working as a reporter for the GDR's Allgemeiner Deutscher Nachrichtendienst. It was during his days as a reporter that he started writing literature. In 1965 he became a full-time writer. In addition to writing novels, he penned science-fiction short stories and radio dramas as well co-authoring the unproduced thirteen-part GDR television series Raumlotsen. There followed a period in which he was out of favor with the ruling powers and earned his keep through pick-up jobs and writing under pseudonyms. By the mid-80s, he was once again able to publish. From 1990 until he retired in 1997, he worked for the Märkische Allgemeine Zeitung in Potsdam.

Selected publications 
 Asteroidenjäger (1961; movie version produced by DEFA in 1970 as Signale – Ein Weltraumabenteuer, directed by Gottfried Kolditz)
 Der blaue Planet (1963)
 Der Untergang der Astronautic (1963)
 Im Schatten der Tiefsee (1965)
 Die Umkehr der Meridian. Raumfahrterzählung aus dem Jahre 2232 (1966)
 Das unirdische Raumschiff (1967)
 Rekordflug im Jet-Orkan (1970)
 Krakentang (1972)
 Magma am Himmel (1975)
 Vikonda (1986)
 Raumlotsen-Series
 Zurück zum Erdenball (2009)
 Orbitale Balance (2010)
 Daheim auf Erden (2011)
 Stern von Gea  (2011)

References

External links 
 Biography at epilog.de
 

1932 births
2021 deaths
People from Curitiba
German science fiction writers
German male writers